Ela Township is a township in Lake County, Illinois, USA.  As of the 2010 census, its population was 42,654.

History
Ela Township bears the name of George Ela, an Illinois legislator.

Geography
Lakes in this township include Ashley Lake, Bresen Lake, Echo Lake, Forest Lake, Lake Germaine, Lake Louise, Lake Zurich and Leo Lake.

Cities and towns
 Barrington (northeast edge)
 Deer Park (vast majority)
 Forest Lake
 Hawthorn Woods (vast majority)
 Kildeer
 Lake Zurich
 Long Grove (west half)
 North Barrington (east quarter)

The United States Census data from the year 2000 shows Arlington Heights, primarily in Cook County, extending slightly into the southeast corner of Ela Township (covering 0.00 sq mi), as well as the southwest corner of Vernon Township (covering 0.01 sq mi) directly to the east of Ela.  However, the Lake County GIS shows an even smaller extension into Vernon Township and none into Ela.

Adjacent townships
 Fremont Township (north)
 Libertyville Township (northeast)
 Vernon Township (east)
 Wheeling Township, Cook County (southeast)
 Palatine Township, Cook County (south)
 Barrington Township, Cook County (southwest)
 Cuba Township (west)
 Wauconda Township (northwest)

Cemeteries
The township contains three main cemeteries: Fairfield, Lake Zurich and Saint Matthew Lutheran.

Major highways
 U.S. Route 12
 Illinois State Route 22
 Illinois State Route 53

Airports and landing strips
 Honey Lake Heliport
 Rotor Swing Heliport

Railroad lines
 Canadian National Railway

Demographics

References
Bibliography
 U.S. Board on Geographic Names (GNIS)
 United States Census Bureau cartographic boundary files
Notes

External links
 Ela Township official website
 US-Counties.com
 City-Data.com
 US Census
 Illinois State Archives

Townships in Lake County, Illinois
Townships in Illinois